The HCA Red List of Endangered Crafts is an inventory of traditional crafts and trades practiced in the UK that are at risk of dying out in the succeeding generation. The original HCA Red List, which took two years to compile, was first published by the Heritage Crafts Association in on 3 May 2017 with financial support from The Radcliffe Trust. The inventory evaluated 169 crafts and all are graded along the model of animal species at risk, using categories: least concern, endangered, critically endangered, near-extinct and extinct.

The second edition of the Red List was published on 9 March 2019, with 212 crafts evaluated; the critically endangered list increased to 36 crafts. 102 crafts were classified as currently viable.

Research for the third edition of the Red List began in September 2020, with financial support from the Pilgrim Trust, and was released on 24 May 2021. This edition evaluated 244 crafts and, added a further 27 skills added to the list including kilt making and sheet glass blowing.

Red List
The HCA Red List, originally known as the Radcliffe Red List, was modelled on the IUCN Red List and other such inventories, and was influenced by UNESCO's work on the safeguarding of intangible cultural heritage. The United Kingdom is one of only a few countries whose intangible cultural heritage is not yet recognised by UNESCO. The publication, which took two years to compile, was launched at the House of Lords and was subsequently featured in various media, including BBC Radio 4 Woman's Hour.

It is the first report of its kind in the UK, although an earlier general analysis of the heritage craft sector and its contribution to the economy in England was undertaken in 2012 by the Department for Business, Innovation and Skills.
The report identifies a heritage craft as “a practice which employs manual dexterity and skill and an understanding of traditional materials, design and techniques, and which has been practised for two or more successive generations”. It also summarises some of the reasons for the decline of heritage crafts in the UK including the difficulties recruiting apprentices, the increased age of the artisan workforce, high prices for articles made by hand and an overall decline in demand. Greta Bertram, who managed the original report, identified one of the principle aims of the report was to bring pressure upon the government to help preserve the crafts for the future, saying, 
Whilst heritage conservation has gained widespread popularity over the last century, preserving buildings and architecture for the future, the HCA has championed craft skills as part of British cultural heritage for similar preservation, and hopes to use the Red List to inform policy decisions on where to invest future funding.

The foreword to the original Red List was written by the Prince of Wales in his capacity as President of the Heritage Crafts Association, stating,

The second edition of the Red List was published in March 2019 and watchmaking joined the critically endangered category, with fewer than 30 watchmakers able to commercially create a watch from scratch. It is hoped that its inclusion may encourage the UK to become a signatory of UNESCO's Convention for the Safeguarding of the Intangible Cultural Heritage.

The third edition, released in May 2021, added a further 20 crafts to the list, citing the COVID-19 lockdown in the UK as a contributing factor. Sheet glass blowing, barometer making, Scottish kilt making, Shetlands lace making and glass eye making were all added.

Extinct crafts
In the 2019 and 2021 editions of the Red List, four crafts were identified as having been already lost in the UK in the preceding decade: 
goldbeating, 
the making of cricket balls, 
traditional lacrosse stick manufacturing, and
paper mould and deckle making, a form of specialised papermaking.

The last British goldbeaters, W. Habberley Meadows, and Dukes Cricket Balls of London both stopped production in the UK after being unable to recruit an apprentice, having both suffered the effects of cheaper foreign competition.

The original Red List included the manufacture of riddles, a kind of sieve. Following the publication of the report in 2017, however, two individuals came forward to revive the craft, one of whom persuaded the last riddle maker to train them, despite him having retired. The trainees are currently attempting to become commercially viable, thus removing the craft from the extinct category.

Paper mould and deckle making was added to extinct category in the 2019 following the death of the last UK maker Ron MacDonald in 2017.

Critically endangered crafts
At the time of the report's release in 2017, there were seventeen traditional crafts in the 'critically endangered' category, defined as having no trainees to continue the skills involved and as being practiced by either a very small number of artisans or produced by two or fewer companies in the UK. The list grew to 36 in 2019, and then to 56 in 2021.

Following the closure of the Whitechapel Bell Foundry (Britain's oldest manufacturing company dating from 1570), bell founding was added to the 2019 list.

A week after the inclusion of sporran making in the critically endangered category of the 2021 list, the Ministry of Defence was criticised in an article in The Times for taking the decision to import military sporrans, leaving Scottish manufacturers on the brink of ruin.

barometer making
basketwork furniture making
bell founding
bowed-felt hat making
brilliant cutting
clay pipe making
clog making with hand-carved soles
coiled straw basket making
compass making
copper wheel engraving
currach making
damask weaving
Devon stave basket making
diamond cutting
engine turning
Fair Isle straw backed chair making
fan making
flute making
fore-edge painting
frame knitting
glass eye making
hat plaiting
hazel basket making
Highlands and Islands thatching
horse collar making
Horsehair weaving
kishie basket making
maille making
metal thread making
millwrighting
mouth-blown sheet glass making
oak bark tanning
orrery making
paper making (commercial handmade)
parchment and vellum making
piano making
plane making
pointe shoe making
pottery (industrial)
saw making
scissor making
Shetland lace knitting
shinty caman making
sieve and riddle making
silver spinning
spade making (forged heads)
spinning wheel making
sporran making
swill basket making
tinsmithing
wainwrighting
watch face enamelling
watchmaking
withy pot making
wooden fishing net making

See also
 Craft Northern Ireland
 Living Human Treasure
 Rural crafts

References

External links
HCA Red List of Endangered Crafts
The Radcliffe Trust

Traditional knowledge
Craft occupations
Labour in the United Kingdom